Adam Hilary Kalistavich Hurynowicz (25 January 1869 in Kavali, near Vileysky Uyezd, Vilna Governorate – 4 July 1894 in Russian Empire now Belarus) was a Belarusian poet and folklorist. He was best known for his Polish, Belarusian and Russian-language poems and folkloristics.

He was born to Polish noble family in the village of Kavali. In 1887 until 1893, he graduated at Saint Petersburg State Institute of Technology. As a child he studied at school in Vilnius. He learnt ethnographic material. Hurynowicz was arrested for revolutionary protest in Vilnius and was deported to Saint Petersburg. His influential work was Francišak Bahuševič. He translated works in Russian, Ukrainian and Polish language. He died on 4 July 1894 in Russian Empire, aged 25.

1869 births
1894 deaths
People from Myadzyel District
People from Vileysky Uyezd
Belarusian nobility
Belarusian male poets
19th-century Belarusian poets
Belarusian writers in Polish
Prisoners of the Peter and Paul Fortress